Seyed Mahdi Hosseini Rohani  (15 July 1925 - 23 November 2000)  was an Iranian Ayatollah born in Qom. He served in the  First, Second, and Third terms of the Assembly of Experts.

Family Background 
Mahdi Rohani was born into a very religious family. His father, Ayatollah Abdolhassan Rohani, was a scholar in Qom Seminary teaching Islam. His father was a prominent student of Abu l-Hasan al-Isfahani and Abdul-Karim Haeri Yazdi. His grandfather Ayatollah Sadeq Qomiye was a student of the great Murtadha al-Ansari. His mother is the daughter of Seyed Fakhreddin Qomiye and granddaughter of Mirza-ye Qomi.

He is also the cousin of Mohammad Sadeq Rouhani and Seyed Mohammad Hosseini Rohani, both of whom are Marja', otherwise known as Grand Ayatollah.

Education 
At an early age, Mahdi Rohani was being taught how to read and write Arabic by his father, as well as learning the Quran. He then attended Qom Seminary during his time in High School, where he would further his Islamic studies. At age 19, he decided to migrate to Najaf to attend Hawza Najaf. While there he had the benefit of being taught Faraid al-Usool by Mirza Hassan Yazdi, al-Makasib by Yahya Modaressi Yazdi, and Kefayat al-Usool by Mirza Baqer Zanjani.

Then in 1951 he migrated back to Qom where he mastered his levels of Islamic Knowledge and eventually reaching the level of Ijtihad to become a Faqīh. While in Qom he was taught by the likes of Ruhollah Khomeini, Seyyed Mohammad Hojjat Kooh Kamari, Hossein Borujerdi, Seyed Mohammad Mohaghegh Damad, Ahmad Khonsari and Muhammad Husayn Tabatabai. With the help of his teachers, he perfected his knowledge in Fiqh (Jurisprudence), Usool Fiqh (Principles of Islamic Jurisprudence), Islamic philosophy, Kalam (Islamic Theology) and Tafsir (Interpretation of Quran).

Teachers 

Over the years Mahdi Rohani had many teachers on his path to becoming a Mujtahid. Here is a few of them.

 Seyed Morteza Alavi Faridani
 Mirza Mohammad Ali Adib Tehrani
 Jafar Sabouri Qomi
 Abdolrazaaq Ghaeni
 Mohammad Hosseini Ghaeni
 Mirza Hassan Yazdi
 Yahya Modaressi Yazdi
 Mirza Baqer Zanjani
 Mohammad-Taqi Bahjat Foumani
 Ruhollah Khomeini
 Seyyed Mohammad Hojjat Kooh Kamari
 Hossein Borujerdi
 Seyed Mohammad Mohaghegh Damad
 Ahmad Khonsari
 Muhammad Husayn Tabatabai

Students 

Mahdi Rohani also taught others when he was an Ayatollah. Here are some of his students:

 Sadr al-Din Haeri Shirazi
 Seyed Jafar Morteza Ameli
 Seyed Morteza Morteza Ameli
 Rasul Jafarian
 Ali Safaei Haeri
 Hossein Qatife
 Seyed Ali Mir Sharifi
 Mohammad Ali Bebar
 Mohammad Javad Fazel Lankarani
 Seyed Hadi Hosseini Rohani (His Son)
 Sheikh Mohammad Ali Shahabadi (His Son-in-Law)

Works 

The following is a list of works either published, or unpublished.

 The Evolution of The Salafi Sect - (Published in Arabic and Farsi)
 Research and Discussion with Sunnis and Salafis - (Published in Arabic)
 The Three Rakaat of Witr Prayer - (Published in Farsi and Arabic)
 The Hadith of Ahlul Bayt (Peace be upon them) in Ahlul Sunnah - (Published in Arabic)
 Tafsir (Interpretation) of Surah Fajr
 Tafsir (Interpretation) of Surah Hamd
 The History of the Different Sects in Islam
 Lectures of Jurisprudence of Ayatollah Mohaghegh Damad
 Notes on Jurisprudence
 The Ash'ari Theology (part 1) (Published in Arabic)
 The Ash'ari Theology (part 2) (Published in Arabic)
 The Ash'ari Theology (part 3) (Published in Arabic)
 A Treatise on Tajweed (Published in Farsi)
 A Proposal to Determine the Exact Line for the Qibla (Published in Farsi)
 The Origin of History, Hijri or Ad? (Published in Arabic)
 The Fiqh and Fundamental Views of Sheikh Bahai (Published in Arabic)
 An Introduction to the Book, "Sarr al-Sa'ada" (The Secret of Happiness) (Published in Arabic)

Death 

Ayatollah Mahdi Rohani passed away on Thursday, 23 November 2000 in Qom. He was buried next to his lifelong friend, Ayatollah Ahmadi Mianji in Fatima Masumeh Shrine. The prayers were led by Ayatollah Mohammad-Taqi Bahjat Foumani. Supreme Leader of Iran Ali Khamenei also sent a message of condolence on his passing.

See also 

 List of members in the First Term of the Council of Experts
 List of members in the Second Term of the Council of Experts
 List of members in the Third Term of the Council of Experts
 List of Ayatollahs
 Karamatollah Malek-Hosseini

References 

1925 births
2000 deaths
20th-century Iranian politicians
Members of the Assembly of Experts
Society of Seminary Teachers of Qom members
Iranian ayatollahs